Back in the Day is a British game show that was broadcast on Channel 4 in 2005. It is hosted by Clive Anderson.

External links
 
 

2000s British game shows
2005 British television series debuts
2005 British television series endings
Channel 4 game shows